Marie-Anne Charlotte de Corday d'Armont (27 July 1768 – 17 July 1793), known as Charlotte Corday, was a figure of the French Revolution. In 1793, she was executed by guillotine for the assassination of Jacobin leader Jean-Paul Marat, who through his role as a politician and journalist was in part responsible for the more radical course the Revolution had taken. Marat had played a substantial role in the political purge of the Girondins, with whom Corday sympathized. His murder was depicted in the painting The Death of Marat by Jacques-Louis David, which shows Marat's dead body after Corday had stabbed him in his medicinal bath. In 1847, writer Alphonse de Lamartine gave Corday the posthumous nickname l'ange de l'assassinat (the Angel of Assassination).

Biography

Born in Saint-Saturnin-des-Ligneries, a hamlet in the commune of Écorches (Orne), in Normandy, Charlotte Corday was a member of a minor aristocratic family. She was a fifth-generation descendant of the dramatist Pierre Corneille. Her parents were cousins.

While Corday was a young girl, her older sister and their mother, Charlotte Marie Jacqueline Gaultier de Mesnival, died. Her father, Jacques François de Corday, Seigneur d'Armont (1737–1798), unable to cope with his grief over their deaths, sent Corday and her younger sister to the Abbaye aux Dames convent in Caen, where the former had access to the abbey's library and first encountered the writings of Plutarch, Rousseau and Voltaire. After 1791, she lived in Caen with her cousin, Madame Le Coustellier de Bretteville-Gouville. The two developed a close relationship, and Corday was the sole heir to her cousin's estate.

Corday's physical appearance is described on her passport as "five feet and one inch... hair and eyebrows auburn, eyes gray, forehead high, mouth medium size, chin dimpled, and an oval face".

Political influence

After the revolution radicalized further and headed towards terror, Charlotte Corday began to sympathize with the Girondins. She admired their speeches and grew fond of many of the Girondist groups whom she met while living in Caen. She respected the political principles of the Girondins and came to align herself with their thinking. She regarded them as a movement that would ultimately save France. The Girondins represented a more moderate approach to the revolution and they, like Corday, were skeptical about the direction the revolution was taking. They opposed the Montagnards, who advocated a more radical approach to the revolution, which included the extreme idea that the only way the revolution would survive invasion and civil war was through terrorizing and executing those opposed to it. The opposition to this radical thinking, coupled with the influence of the Girondins, ultimately led Corday to carry out her plan to murder one of the most outspoken and popular Montagnard radicals, Jean-Paul Marat.

Corday's action aided in restructuring the private versus public role of the woman in society at the time. The idea of women as second class or less than was challenged, and Corday was considered a hero to those who were against the teachings of Marat. There have been suggestions that her act incited the banning of women's political clubs, and the executions of female activists such as the Girondin Madame Roland.

The influence of Girondin ideas on Corday is evident in her words at her trial: "I have killed one man to save a hundred thousand." As the revolution progressed, the Girondins had become progressively more opposed to the radical, violent propositions of the Montagnards such as Marat and Robespierre. Corday's notion that she was saving a hundred thousand lives echoes this Girondin sentiment as they attempted to slow the revolution and reverse the violence that had escalated since the September Massacres of 1792.

Marat's assassination
Jean-Paul Marat was a member of the radical Jacobin faction that had a leading role during the Reign of Terror. As a journalist, he exerted power and influence through his newspaper, L'Ami du peuple ("The Friend of the People"). Corday's decision to kill Marat was stimulated not only by her revulsion at the September Massacres, for which she held Marat responsible, but by her fear of an all-out civil war. She believed that Marat was threatening the Republic, and that his death would end violence throughout the country. She also believed that King Louis XVI should not have been executed. 

On 9 July 1793, Corday left her cousin, carrying a copy of Plutarch's Parallel Lives, and went to Paris, where she took a room at the Hôtel de Providence. She bought a kitchen knife with a  blade. During the next few days, she wrote her Adresse aux Français amis des lois et de la paix ("Address to the French, friends of Law and Peace") to explain her motives for assassinating Marat.

Corday initially planned to assassinate Marat in front of the entire National Convention. She intended to make an example of him, but upon arriving in Paris she discovered that Marat no longer attended meetings because his health was deteriorating due to a skin disorder (perhaps dermatitis herpetiformis). She was then forced to change her plan. She went to Marat's home before noon on 13 July, claiming to have knowledge of a planned Girondist uprising in Caen; she was turned away by Catherine Evrard, the sister of Marat's fiancée Simonne.

On her return that evening, Marat admitted her. At the time, he conducted most of his affairs from a bathtub because of his skin condition. Marat wrote down the names of the Girondins that she gave to him; she then pulled out the knife and plunged it into his chest. He called out: Aidez-moi, ma chère amie! ("Help me, my dear friend!"), and then died.

This is the moment memorialized by Jacques-Louis David's painting The Death of Marat. A different angle of the iconic pose of Marat dead in his bath is in Paul-Jacques-Aimé Baudry's 1860 painting Charlotte Corday.

In response to Marat's dying shout, Simonne Evrard rushed into the room. She was joined by a distributor of Marat's newspaper, who seized Corday. Two neighbours, a military surgeon and a dentist, attempted to revive Marat. Republican officials arrived to interrogate Corday, and to calm a hysterical crowd who appeared ready to lynch her.

Trial

Charlotte Corday sent the following farewell letter to her father which was intercepted and read during the trial, the letter helping to establish that Marat's murder was premeditated:

Corday underwent three separate cross-examinations by senior revolutionary judicial officials, including the President of the Revolutionary Tribunal and the chief prosecutor. She stressed that she was a republican and had been so even before the Revolution, citing the values of ancient Rome as an ideal model.

The focus of the questioning was to establish whether she had been part of a wider Girondist conspiracy. Corday remained constant in insisting that "I alone conceived the plan and executed it." She referred to Marat as a "hoarder" and a "monster" who was respected only in Paris. She credited her fatal knifing of Marat with one blow not to practicing in advance but to luck.

Charlotte Corday asked for Gustave le Doulcet, an old acquaintance, to defend her, but he did not receive the letter she wrote to him in time, so Claude François Chauveau-Lagarde was appointed instead to assist her during the trial. It is believed that Antoine Quentin Fouquier-Tinville voluntarily delayed the letter, however, it is said that Corday thought that Le Doulcet refused to defend her and sent to him a last letter of reproach just before going to the scaffold.

Execution

Following her sentencing Corday asked the court if her portrait could be painted, purportedly to record her true self. She made her request pleading, "Since I still have a few moments to live, might I hope, citizens, that you will allow me to have myself painted." Given permission, she selected as the artist a National Guard officer, Jean-Jacques Hauer, who had already begun sketching her from the gallery of the courtroom. Hauer's likeness (see above) was completed shortly before Corday was summoned to the tumbril, after she had viewed it and suggested a few changes.

Since her execution, many authors have written describing Corday as a natural blonde, primarily due to this portrait by Hauer. Although Hauer admired her and took a keen interest in her fate  he had to depict Corday as a vain aristocrat and counterrevolutionary for his own protection. To give the idea that she had taken the time to make herself presentable and powder her hair before murdering Marat, Hauer painted Corday's hair a very light shade. Despite the fame of this one portrait, many other paintings (done both in life and posthumously) show Corday in her true brunette form, and her passport describes her hair as "chestnut" (châtains), refuting the idea that Corday had fair hair.

On 17 July 1793, four days after Marat was killed, Corday was executed by the guillotine in the Place de Grève wearing the red overblouse denoting a condemned traitor who had assassinated a representative of the people. Standing alone in the tumbril amid a large and curious crowd she remained calm, although drenched by a sudden summer rainfall. Her body was buried in the Madeleine Cemetery. Her skull was said to have been removed from her grave and passed from person to person in later years.

Aftermath
After Corday's decapitation, a man named Legros lifted her head from the basket and slapped it on the cheek. Charles-Henri Sanson, the executioner, indignantly rejected published reports that Legros was one of his assistants. Sanson stated in his diary that Legros was in fact a carpenter who had been hired to make repairs to the guillotine. Witnesses report an expression of "unequivocal indignation" on her face when her cheek was slapped. The oft-repeated anecdote has served to suggest that victims of the guillotine may in fact retain consciousness for a short while, including by Albert Camus in his Reflections on the Guillotine. ("Charlotte Corday's severed head blushed, it is said, under the executioner's slap.").

This offense against a woman executed moments before was considered unacceptable and Legros was imprisoned for three months because of his outburst.

Jacobin leaders had her body autopsied immediately after her death to see if she was a virgin. They believed there was a man sharing her bed and the assassination plans. To their dismay, she was found to be a virgin.

The direct consequences of her crime were opposite to what she expected: the assassination did not stop the Jacobins or the Terror, which intensified after the murder. Also Marat became a martyr, a bust of him replaced a religious statue on the rue aux Ours and a number of place-names were changed to honor Marat.

Corday's act transformed the idea of what a woman was capable of, and to those who did not shun her for her act, she was a heroine. André Chénier, for example, wrote a poem in honor of Corday. This highlighted the "masculinity" possessed by Corday during the revolution.

The Revolution and women 

Corday's killing of Marat was considered vile, an "arch-typically masculine statement", which reaction showed that whether or not one approved of what she did, it is clear that the murder of Marat changed the political role and position of women during the French Revolution. Corday was surprised by the reaction of revolutionary women, stating, "As I was truly calm I suffered from the shouts of a few women. But to save your country means not noticing what it costs."

After Corday murdered Marat, the majority of women distanced themselves from her because they believed that what she had done would spark a reaction against the now developing feminist movement, which was already facing criticism. Also, many of these women were attached to Marat in that they were supporters of his revolutionary efforts and sympathized with him as citizens of France.

Cultural references

American dramatist Sarah Pogson Smith memorialised Corday in her 1807 verse drama The Female Enthusiast: A Tragedy in Five Acts.
Percy Bysshe Shelley wrote about her in his Posthumous Fragments of Margaret Nicholson (1810).
Alphonse de Lamartine devoted to her a book of his Histoire des Girondins series (1847), in which he gave her this now-famous nickname: "l'ange de l'assassinat" (the angel of assassination).
French dramatist François Ponsard wrote a play, Charlotte Corday, that was premièred at the Théâtre-Français in March 1850.
In the 1862 novel Les Misérables, Combeferre likens Enjolras's execution of Le Cabuc to Corday's assassination of Marat, calling it a "liberating murder".
Harper's Weekly mentioned Corday in their 29 April 1865 edition, in a series of articles analyzing the assassination of Abraham Lincoln, as the "one assassin whom history mentions with toleration and even applause", but goes on to conclude that her assassination of Marat was a mistake in that she became Marat's victim rather than saving or helping his victims.
At the end of Act III, before departing to kill the Czar, the eponymous heroine of Oscar Wilde's play Vera; or, The Nihilists (1880) exclaims "the spirit of Charlotte Corday has entered my soul now".
In 1894, Kyrle Bellew penned a play in four acts detailing the assassination entitled Charlotte Corday, taking the role of Marat, while his acting partner Cora Urquhart Brown-Potter played as Charlotte Corday.
In the 1903 novel Rebecca of Sunnybrook Farm, young Rebecca re-enacts a scene of Charlotte Corday in prison, with her friends playing the role of the mob.
The 1919 German silent film Charlotte Corday starred Lya Mara in the title role.  
Drieu La Rochelle wrote a play in three acts called Charlotte Corday in 1939. It was performed in southern France during World War II. Corday is depicted as a fervent republican who hopes eliminating Marat will save the revolution and prevent it from degenerating into tyranny.
In Peter Weiss's 1963 Marat/Sade, the assassination of Marat is presented as a play, written by the Marquis de Sade, to be performed for the public by inmates of the asylum at Charenton. 
Italian composer Lorenzo Ferrero composed an opera in three acts, Charlotte Corday, for the 200th anniversary of the French Revolution which was commemorated in 1989.
Corday is a character in Katherine Neville's 1988 novel The Eight. In the novel, Marat is killed, not by Corday, but by a former nun named Mireille. Corday accepts the blame and is executed for the crime so that Mireille may continue her quest for the mysterious and powerful Montglane Chess Service.
Actor Herbert Lom's 1993 novel Dr Guillotine features Corday as a principal protagonist in a story set around the Reign of Terror.
British singer-songwriter Al Stewart included a song co-written by Tori Amos about Corday on his album Famous Last Words (1993).
Charlotte appears briefly but significantly, in Caen, in A Far Better Rest (2010), by Susanne Alleyn, a reimagining of A Tale of Two Cities.
The graphic novel series L'Ordre Du Chaos includes a whole book dedicated to Charlotte Corday and Marat (2014).
Corday is a central character in Lauren Gunderson's 2017 play The Revolutionists, a comedic quartet about four French women during the Reign of Terror.
Corday appears in the mobile videogame Fate/Grand Order as a playable servant of the "Assassin" class to be summoned by the player.
Solving Marat's murder is a mission in the videogame Assassin's Creed Unity. Corday is one of the suspects and confesses to the murder.

Gallery

References

Attribution

Further reading
•	Montfort, Catherine R."For the Defence: Charlotte Corday's letters from prison." Studies on Voltaire and the Eighteenth Century 329 (1995): 235-47
 .
 .
 .
 .
 .
 .
 .
 .
 .
 .
 .
 .
 
 .
 .

External links

.
.

18th-century French criminals
1768 births
1793 deaths
1793 murders in Europe
People from Orne
French assassins
French people executed by guillotine during the French Revolution
French nobility
Girondins
French Roman Catholics
Executed assassins
French female murderers
Executed French women
People convicted of murder by France
French people convicted of murder
Women in the French Revolution
Female revolutionaries